The Greensboro History Museum, consisting of the former First Presbyterian Church of Greensboro and Smith Memorial Building, is a historic museum building located at 130 Summit Ave. in Greensboro, Guilford County, North Carolina. The former Presbyterian church was built in 1892 on the site of a former Confederate hospital, and is a Romanesque Revival style brick building with a cross gable roof and tower. The semi-circular, 11 bay, Smith Memorial Building was built in 1903. It features four octagonal sides and a tower. The memorial building was designed by the architect Charles Christian Hook (1870-1938). The church and memorial building were connected and the older structures modified and renovated in 1938. Also located on the property is the First Presbyterian Church cemetery, established in 1831, after the first church was built on land that was donated by Jesse H. Lindsay. The church vacated the property in 1929, and in 1937-1938 it was renovated and enlarged as the Richardson Civic Center and donated to the city of Greensboro. It subsequently housed the Greensboro Public Library, the Greensboro Historical Museum, and the Greensboro Art Center. The historic building functions as one part of the current, larger Greenboro History Museum.

It was listed on the National Register of Historic Places in 1985.

Notable burials
 Attorney and justice Robert P. Dick (1823-1898)
 Representative and Confederate senator John Adams Gilmer (1805-1868)
 North Carolina Governor John Motley Morehead (1796-1866)

Gallery

References

External links

Greensboro History.org Official web site

American Civil War hospitals
Buildings and structures on the National Register of Historic Places in North Carolina
Romanesque Revival architecture in North Carolina
Churches completed in 1892
1812 establishments in North Carolina
Museums in Greensboro, North Carolina
History museums in North Carolina
Churches in Greensboro, North Carolina
North Carolina in the American Civil War
Former Presbyterian churches in the United States
Former churches in North Carolina
National Register of Historic Places in Guilford County, North Carolina
Museums on the National Register of Historic Places